Off the Coast of Me is the debut album by Kid Creole and the Coconuts, released in 1980. The album was reissued in 2003 with additional bonus tracks by Universal Island Records.

Production
The album kicked off a loose narrative—Kid Creole's search for good times and his "dream babe," Mimi—that continued over the course of the next few albums. It was produced by August Darnell.

Critical reception
Trouser Press wrote that the album's "uniqueness and danceability, along with the Kid’s occasionally risqué wordplay, are enough to suggest the band’s potential."

Track listing

Personnel

Performers
Kid Creole – vocals
The Coconuts (Adriana Kaegi, Brooksie Wells, Fonda Rae, Lourdes Cotto) – vocals
Peter Schott – piano
Franz Krauns – guitar
Coati Mundi – vibes
Andrew Lloyd – percussion
Winston Grennan – drums
Tommy Browder – bass

Technical credits
August Darnell – producer
Michael Zilkha – directed by (executive producer)
Sugar-Coated Andy Hernandez (1-6, 8) – orchestrations
Stony Browder Jr. – orchestrations (7)
Bobby Blank and Jules McBrown – engineering
August Darnell and Robert Blank – mixing
Tony Wright – art direction
George Dubose – photography
Richard Cramer – typography and graphics

References

1980 debut albums
Kid Creole and the Coconuts albums
Island Records albums
ZE Records albums